Andrew G. Alleyne is the Dean of the College of Science and Engineering at the University of Minnesota. He was previously the Ralph M. and Catherine V. Fisher Professor in Engineering and Director of the National Science Foundation Engineering Research Center on Power Optimization of Electro Thermal Systems at the University of Illinois Urbana-Champaign. His work considers decision making in complex physical systems. He is a fellow of the American Society of Mechanical Engineers, Institute of Electrical and Electronics Engineers, and the American Association for the Advancement of Science.

Early life and education 
Alleyne attended Walt Whitman High School in Bethesda, MD and graduated in 1985.  For his undergraduate education he studied mechanical and aerospace engineering at Princeton University and graduated magna cum laude in 1989. After college he joined NASA's Jet Propulsion Laboratory in Pasadena, CA where he worked on a comet nucleus sample return mission.  On leave from JPL, he moved to the University of California, Berkeley, for his graduate studies, and earned his master's degree in 1992 and doctoral degree in 1994, both in mechanical engineering. Alleyne was appointed to the faculty of the Mechanical and Industrial Engineering department at University of Illinois Urbana-Champaign in 1994. The Mechanical and Industrial Engineering department was renamed the Mechanical Science and Engineering (MechSE) department.

Career 
In 2004 Alleyne was the youngest person in the Department of Mechanical Science and Engineering at the University of Illinois Urbana-Champaign to be promoted to Professor. He was also the youngest faculty member to hold a named professorship in the department.  Alleyne held a visiting position as a Fulbright scholar at the Delft University of Technology. In 2008 he was appointed Associate Dean for Research in the College of Engineering at the University of Illinois, Urbana-Champaign. In 2011–2012, he held a National Research Council Fellowship and worked at the Air Force Research Laboratory in Dayton, OH.

Alleyne works on the dynamic modeling and simulation of complex systems as well as the development of algorithms for decision making for complex system. The decision making usually occurs very rapidly while the systems are in operation.  His work relies on control theory; a means to evaluate how systems behave with a series of inputs and desired outputs. This may include nanoscale motion control, vehicle systems dynamics and energy management (including heating, ventilation, and air conditioning systems).  His work is a continuum from mathematical theory, through computational tools, and then experimental validation in prototypes. 

For algorithms, he has made significant contributions to advances in Iterative Learning Control (ILC). Alleyne has created several high precision algorithms that include design rules for ILC feedforward trajectories. For experimental systems, he has developed the platform and process control for electro-hydrodynamic jet printing; which allows for the precise printing of wide variety materials and has seen commercial adoption. He has developed a commercial software that can simulate transient thermal systems called Thermosys, which is a MATLAB/Simulink toolbox for modeling dynamic transients in HVAC systems. He has created ways to dynamically monitor and control thermal management systems for power electronics, which are used in planes, ships and cars. Alleyne worked with the Air Force Research Laboratory to create the Aircraft Transient Thermal Modeling and Optimization toolbox. A more complete listing of research efforts can be found at his departmental website at Illinois.

In addition to his research efforts on campus, Alleyne has participated in several governmental efforts in service to the United States.  After participating in the Defense Science Study Group, run by the Institute for Defense Analysis, he served on the U.S. Air Force Scientific Advisory Board as well as National Academies Board on Army Research and Development.  He was also a member of a Quadrennial Technology Review from the Department of Energy.

Awards and honors 
His awards and honors include;

 2005 Elected Fellow of the American Society of Mechanical Engineers
 2008 American Society of Mechanical Engineers Gustus L. Larson Memorial Award
 2012 Air Force Meritorious Civilian Service Award
 2014 American Society of Mechanical Engineers Henry M. Paynter Outstanding Investigator Award
 2016 American Society of Mechanical Engineers Charles Stark Draper Innovative Practice Award
2018 American Automatic Control Council Control Engineering Practice Award
 2017 Elected Fellow of the Institute of Electrical and Electronics Engineers
 2019 University of Illinois at Urbana–Champaign Innovation Transfer Award
 2019 Elected Fellow of the American Association for the Advancement of Science
 2019 American Society of Mechanical Engineers Milliken Award
2020 American Society of Mechanical Engineers Robert Henry Thurston Lecture Award
2020 Chief of Staff of the Air Force Award for Exceptional Public Service

Academic service 
In addition to serving in numerous service leadership roles at Illinois and in the broader professional academic community, Alleyne has worked to improve inclusivity and gender balance within science and engineering. When he arrived at MechSE in 1994 there were no women faculty members in the department, and only one in ten members of faculty of the College of Engineering were women. Since becoming professor in 2004 Alleyne has served on several recruitment committees and transformed the MechSE faculty to 25% women. Alleyne has developed a ten step plan to improve recruitment of diverse candidates, which he has since shared with other universities.  In 2017 he was awarded the Society of Women Engineers Advocating Women in Engineering Award in recognition of his commitment to gender equality.

Alongside a commitment to inclusivity and gender equality, Alleyne has been dedicated to teaching and learning throughout his academic career. He was awarded the Engineering Council Award for Excellence in Advising in 1998 and 1999, and is consistently praised by his students. Due to his efforts inside and outside the classroom, as well as his commitment to building educational infrastructure, he has been recognized with the UIUC College of Engineering Teaching Excellence Award, the UIUC Campus Award for Excellence in Undergraduate Teaching, and the UIUC Campus Award for Excellence in Graduate Student Mentoring. His efforts toward teaching and mentoring diversity was recognized by the UIUC Larine Y. Cowan "Make a Difference" award in 2014. In 2016 he was awarded the University of Illinois at Urbana–Champaign Outstanding Advisor Award. For educational contributions outside of UIUC, he was presented with the American Society of Mechanical Engineers Yasundo Takahashi Education Award in 2017 for his contributions to education relevant to the Dynamic Systems and Control Division.

Alleyne was named as the new Dean of the College of Science and Engineering at the University of Minnesota in September 2021. He assumed the role January 10th, 2022.

Publications

Personal life 
Alleyne is married to Marianne Alleyne, an entomology professor at University of Illinois at Urbana–Champaign, with whom he has two children.

References 

Living people
Year of birth missing (living people)
Princeton University School of Engineering and Applied Science alumni
UC Berkeley College of Engineering alumni
University of Illinois Urbana-Champaign faculty
Fellows of the American Association for the Advancement of Science
American mechanical engineers